Alexa Guarachi and Desirae Krawczyk were the defending champions, but Guarachi chose not to participate this year and Krawczyk chose to compete in Stuttgart instead.

Veronika Kudermetova and Elise Mertens won the title, defeating Nao Hibino and Makoto Ninomiya in the final, 6–1, 6–1.

Seeds

Draw

Draw

References

 Main Draw

2021 WTA Tour
2021 İstanbul Cup – 2
2021 in Istanbul
2021 in Turkish tennis